NICL may refer to:

 National Ice Core Laboratory of the United States Geological Survey
 National Insurance Company Limited of India
 North Iowa Cedar League, a high-school athletic conference in Iowa
 New International Division of Cultural Labor